Lennart Åberg (26 February 1942 – 30 September 2021) was a Swedish jazz saxophonist and composer. In 1972, he founded Rena Rama, a Swedish jazz fusion group. He also taught jazz history at the Royal College of Music, Stockholm. He was a member of composer George Russell's ensemble in the 1980s along with Jon Christensen, Arild Andersen, and Jan Garbarek, appearing on The Essence of George Russell (Soul Note 1983). In 2002, he received the Djangodor in the Contemporary Star of Jazz category.  In addition to jazz, Aberg also worked in musical styles from India, Africa, and Eastern Europe, as well as contemporary music.

Discography
 Partial Solar Eclipse (Japo, 1977)
 Green Prints (Caprice, 1988)
 Seven Pieces (Phono Suecia, 2000)
 Bobo Stenson/Lennart Åberg (Amigo, 2003) – with Bobo Stenson 
 Free Spirit with Peter Erskine (Amigo, 2006)
 Up North (Caprice, 2007)

References

External links
 
 

1942 births
2021 deaths
People from Helsingborg
Swedish jazz saxophonists
Rena Rama members
Male saxophonists
Male jazz musicians
20th-century Swedish male musicians
20th-century Swedish musicians
20th-century saxophonists
21st-century Swedish male musicians
21st-century Swedish  musicians
21st-century saxophonists